The 2005 Trans-Am Series was the fortieth season of the Sports Car Club of America's Trans-Am Series. This would be the final complete season until the series returned in 2009. (Two events were held in Topeka in 2006, but are considered to be exhibition and thus no championship was awarded.)

Results

Final points standings

References

Trans-Am Series
2005 in American motorsport